Shirahan may refer to:
 Shirahan-e Bisheh
 Shirahan-e Shahr